The 2012–13 season was Crystal Palace's eighth consecutive season in the Championship. That season saw Dougie Freedman take charge for a third season, before departing to manage Bolton Wanderers on 23 October. Lennie Lawrence and Curtis Fleming acted in caretaker roles, with Lawrence managing for the away games against Barnsley and Leicester City which saw Palace take four points. Although Ian Holloway was appointed manager on 3 November, Fleming took charge for that day's home win against Blackburn Rovers. Holloway's first game in charge was the 5–0 home win against Ipswich Town which saw the club climb to the top of the table.

The 2–1 away victory against Peterborough United on 10 November saw the club make its best start to a league season in 37 years. With the following home win against Derby County on 17 November, Palace extended its unbeaten run to 14 games, a run ended by the away defeat to Leeds United on 24 November. Palace managed to score in every single one of its first 18 matches of the 2012–13 Championship season, a feat unmatched in the division during the season.
Despite a poor run towards the end of the season with only 1 win in their final 10 league games, Crystal Palace gained promotion to the Premier League for the first time in 8 years after beating Watford 1–0 in the 2013 Football League Championship play-off Final at Wembley. The club's 2012–13 season was subject of an Amazon Prime Video five-part series, ‘When Eagles Dare’, documenting their promotion to the top flight via the Championship playoffs.

In the League Cup, Palace beat Exeter City away, coming from behind to win 2–1, before losing to Preston North End, again away from home, in the second round. The third round of the FA Cup saw Palace entertain Stoke City, with a 0–0 home draw forcing a replay, though they ended up losing that game 4–1.

Squad statistics

Statistics

* including play-off appearances
Green means the player is on loan, red means that a loan was terminated.

Goalscorers

Transfers

League table

Matches

Round by Round results

Pre-season results

Championship results

Championship Play-offs results

FA Cup results

Football League Cup results

References

Notes

Crystal Palace F.C. seasons
Crystal Palace